The 2012 Gold Coast Sevens was the first tournament of the 2012-2013 Sevens World Series. It was held over the weekend of 13–14 October 2012 at Robina Stadium (known for sponsorship reasons as Skilled Park) in Queensland, Australia, and was the tenth edition of the Australian Sevens tournament.

Fiji defeated New Zealand 32–14 in the final to successfully defend their title.

Format
The teams were drawn into four pools of four teams each. Each team played everyone in their pool one time. The top two teams from each pool advanced to the Cup/Plate brackets. The bottom two teams from each group went to the Bowl/Shield brackets.

Teams
The participating teams and schedule were announced on 17 September 2012.

Pool Stage

Pool A

Pool B

Pool C

Pool D

Knockout stage

Shield

Bowl

Plate

Cup

References

External links
Gold Coast Sevens

Australian Sevens
Gold Coast Sevens
Gold Coast Sevens
Sport on the Gold Coast, Queensland